The HB-Flugtechnik Dandy is an Austrian ultralight aircraft that was designed by Heino Brditschka and produced by HB-Flugtechnik. The aircraft is supplied as a kit for amateur construction or as a complete ready-to-fly-aircraft.

Design and development
The Dandy was designed to comply with the Fédération Aéronautique Internationale microlight rules. It features a strut-braced high-wing, a two-seats-in-side-by-side configuration enclosed cockpit, fixed conventional landing gear and a single engine in tractor configuration.

The aircraft fuselage is made from welded steel tubing, with the wings constructed from aluminum tubing and all surfaces covered in doped aircraft fabric. The standard engine available is the  Rotax 912UL four-stroke powerplant.

Variants
Dandy
Model with side-by-side seating. In production, 2015.
Cubby
Model with tandem seating, resembling a Piper J-3 Cub. In production, 2015.

Specifications (Dandy)

References

External links

2000s Austrian ultralight aircraft
Homebuilt aircraft
Single-engined tractor aircraft
Dandy
High-wing aircraft